Finding Grace is a 2019 American drama film written and directed by Warren Fast and starring Paris Warner, Jasen Wade, Kisha Ogelsby, Erin Gray and David Keith.  It is Fast's feature directorial debut.

Premise
A struggling family, already on the verge of disintegration, faces new challenges that will test faith in God and each other.

Cast
 Paris Warner as Alaska Rose
 Jasen Wade as Conner Rose
 Kisha Sharon Oglesby as Julianna Foster 
 Erin Gray as Judge Ariel Harper
 David Keith as Bishop Reed
 Bo Svenson as Dr. Nelson
 Bethany Davenport as Amanda Wheeler
 Lacy Hartselle as Amy James
 Braden Balazik as Kyle Rose
 Gage Maynard as Ron
 Warren Fast as Bryan Shaw
 Stacie Fast as Annette Shaw
 Phyllis Spielman as Principal Grey
 David Raizor as Alfredo
 Michael Gladden as Officer Brennan
 Steve Norris as Ben
 DeeJay Sturdivant as Thad
 Israel Varela as Jimmy
 Barbara Chevalier as Lindsey
 Trent Van Alstine as Derek Austin
 Paige Fiser as Kelly Shaw
 Lacie Fiser as Jade Shaw

Production
Filming occurred from April 26 to May 15 of 2018 in Bay County, Florida.

Release
The film premiered at Jordan Commons in Salt Lake City, Utah on December 5, 2019.  It was also released at the Gretchen Nelson Scott Fine Arts Center at Mosley High School in Lynn Haven, Florida on December 11, 2019.  The film was also shown at the SCERA Center For the Arts in Orem, Utah as part of the LDS Film Festival.

Reception
Trina Boice of LDS Living graded the film an A−.

References

External links
 

American drama films
Films shot in Florida
2010s English-language films
2010s American films